David Henry Loos (born March 5, 1947) is a retired American college basketball coach who most recently served as head coach of the men's team at Austin Peay State University, where he is also a former athletic director. He was head coach from 1990 until retiring at the end of the 2016–17 season.

On April 2, 2013, Loos announced that he would relinquish his position as director of athletics to focus solely on coaching basketball. Derek van der Merwe was announced as the successor to Loos on June 5, 2013.  On March 5, 2016, the Loos-coached Governors won the tournament championship of the Ohio Valley Conference, thus qualifying to participate once again in the NCAA Division I men's basketball tournament.

The following season, which ultimately proved to be his last as head coach, was set against the backdrop of a battle with colorectal cancer. During the 2016 offseason, he underwent surgery to remove the malignancy. A malignant lymph node was found during the procedure, and he began chemotherapy. Loos was forced to take a medical leave in January 2017, missing four games. After the Governors failed to make the 2017 OVC tournament, ending their season, Loos chose to retire. The university announced his decision on March 2, which was followed by a full press conference on March 6.

Head coaching record

References

External links
 Austin Peay profile

1947 births
Living people
American men's basketball coaches
American men's basketball players
Austin Peay Governors athletic directors
Austin Peay Governors men's basketball coaches
Basketball coaches from Missouri
Basketball players from St. Louis
College men's basketball head coaches in the United States
High school basketball coaches in the United States
Memphis Tigers men's basketball coaches
Memphis Tigers men's basketball players
Point guards